Laphyang is a town under Diktel Municipality in Khotang District in the Sagarmatha Zone of eastern Nepal. This VDC was merged into Diktel to form municipality in May, 2014. At the time of the 1991 Nepal census it had a population of 2,915 persons living in 498 individual households.

References

External links
UN map of the municipalities of Khotang District

Populated places in Khotang District